Thomas O'Dea, Bishop of Clonfert and Bishop of Galway (7 January 1858 – 9 April 1923) was born in Carron, Kilfenora, County Clare, and educated in Ennis and Maynooth. He was ordained on 25 June 1882 for the Diocese of Galway. He was a member of staff at Maynooth, from the date of his ordination; and served as Vice-President from 1894. He was named Bishop of Clonfert on 16 June 1903, replacing Dr. Healy. He became Bishop of Galway on 29 April 1909.

His plans to build a new cathedral for the town were interrupted by World War I. He was a fluent Irish speaker and a supporter of the GAA.  He was firstly buried in St. Patrick's Pro-Cathedral of Galway, but later re-interred in the crypt of the new Cathedral of Our Lady Assumed into Heaven and St Nicholas, Galway.

References

Sources
 Lickmolassy by the Shannon, p. 200, John Joe Conwell, 1998.
 

1858 births
1923 deaths
People from County Clare
People from County Galway
Alumni of St Patrick's College, Maynooth
Roman Catholic bishops of Clonfert
Roman Catholic bishops of Galway, Kilmacduagh and Kilfenora
Place of death missing